David Cabán (born March 30, 1993) is a soccer player who plays as a midfielder.

Born in the United States, he represented Puerto Rico at international level.

Early and personal life
Cabán was born in Chicago, United States.

Club career
Cabán played youth football for the Chicago Magic and the Chicago Fire, and college soccer with the Wisconsin Badgers from 2011 to 2014. He later played for Bridges FC before turning professional with Swedish club Ånge in July 2016.

He was also with Swedish side IFK Åmål in 2017.

He joined Australian club Beaumaris SC in 2018.

International career
He represented the United States at youth international level, from under-14 to under-18.

He earned three caps for Puerto Rico in 2016.

References

1993 births
Living people
American soccer players
United States men's youth international soccer players
Puerto Rican footballers
Puerto Rico international footballers
Chicago Fire FC players
Wisconsin Badgers men's soccer players
Ånge IF players
IFK Åmål players
Association football midfielders
American expatriate soccer players
Puerto Rican expatriate footballers
American expatriate sportspeople in Sweden
Puerto Rican expatriate sportspeople in Sweden
Expatriate footballers in Sweden
American expatriate sportspeople in Australia
Puerto Rican expatriate sportspeople in Australia
Expatriate soccer players in Australia